"Hovi Baby" is a song by Jay-Z from his album The Blueprint 2: The Gift & The Curse. It was released on November 12, 2002. It was released as the second single from the album. The song is produced by Just Blaze and contains a sample of the live version of "Diggin' on You" by TLC. It peaked at number 76 on the Hot R&B/Hip-Hop Songs chart.

The song is mainly Jay-Z boasting of his success in rap. At one point he hints that only 2Pac and the Notorious B.I.G. might be considered as good:

No music video was made for "Hovi Baby", but the song was used in a Reebok ad, with the lyrics slightly altered.

The B-side of the single features a track also produced by Just Blaze, "U Don't Know (Remix)", featuring M.O.P.

Formats and track listings

A-Side
 Hovi Baby (Radio)
 Hovi Baby (LP Version)
 Hovi Baby (Instrumental)

B-Side
 U Don't Know (Remix) feat. M.O.P. (Radio) 
 U Don't Know (remix) feat. M.O.P. (LP Version) 
 U Don't Know (remix) feat. M.O.P. (Instrumental)

See also
List of songs recorded by Jay-Z

References

2002 singles
2002 songs
Jay-Z songs
Song recordings produced by Just Blaze
Songs written by Jay-Z
Songs written by Babyface (musician)
Songs written by Just Blaze
Roc-A-Fella Records singles